The Diocese of Lleida, known as the Diocese of Lerida in English, (Latin, Ilerdensis) is located in north-eastern Spain, in the province of Lleida, part of the autonomous community of Catalonia. The diocese forms part of the ecclesiastical province of Tarragona, and is thus suffragan to the Archdiocese of Tarragona.

The diocese of Lleida was created in the 3rd century. After the Moorish conquest of Lleida in 716 the episcopal see was moved to Roda (until 1101) and then to Barbastro (1101–1149). The city of Lleida was conquered from the Moors by the Count Ramon Berenguer IV of Barcelona in 1149, and the see was again transferred to its original seat. The Bishop's Palace is located in Rambla d'Aragó.

Lleida is one of the most populous cities in Catalonia, built on the right bank of the River Segre, about 100 miles from Barcelona. The town is oriental in appearance, and its streets are narrow and crooked. The population in 1900 was 23,683. The old Byzantine-Gothic Cathedral, of which the ruins are to be seen on the citadel, dates from 1203. During the Middle Ages the University of Lleida was famous; in 1717 it was suppressed, and united with Cervera.

The current Bishop of Lleida is Salvador Giménez Valls.

History

Roman period

Lleida was the Roman Ilerda, or Herda. During the Punic Wars it sided with the Carthaginians; near it Hanno was defeated by Scipio in 216 BC, and Julius Cæsar defeated Pompey's forces in 49 BC.

La Canal says that the diocese was erected in 600, but others maintain it goes back to the third century, and there is mention of a St. Lycerius, or Glycerius, as Bishop of Lleida in AD 269.

Visigoth and Muslim period (until 1149)

In 514 or 524 a council attended by eight bishops passed decrees forbidding the taking up of arms or the shedding of blood by clerics. A provincial council in 546 regulated ecclesiastical discipline.

In 546AD a Council to regulate ecclesiastical discipline was called in Lerida. A Practice had developed in the Iberian Peninsula, whereby on the death of a bishop, lower ranking clerics (and on occasions the bishops relatives) would ransack and loot the deceased bishops home. The council confirmed that the deceased bishops executors should occupy the bishops residence with guards and defend the premises. Three years later a synod at Valencia changed the protector to the nearest neighboring bishop. Clerics who were caught looting would also be excommunicated. The regulations of the Council were adopted by the General Canon Law of the Roman Catholic Church for implementation in all dioceses.

The signatures of other bishops of Lleida are attached to various councils up to the year 716, when the Moors took possession of the town, and the see was removed to Roda. An unbroken list of bishops of Lleida goes back to the year 887.

In 1101 King Pedro I of Aragon took the city of Barbastro from the Moors and transferred the see from Roda to Barbastro. The first bishop, Poncio, went to Rome to obtain the pope's permission for this transfer.

Diocese of Lleida (from 1149)

The city of Lleida was conquered from the Moors by the Count Ramon Berenguer IV of Barcelona in 1149, and the episcopal see was again transferred to its original seat.

A council in 1173 was presided over by Cardinal Giacinto Bobone, who afterwards became Pope Celestine III. A council in 1246 absolved king James I of Aragon from the sacrilege of cutting out the tongue of the Bishop of Girona.

The seminary was founded in 1722.

During the Peninsular War the French held it (1810), and in 1823 Spain once more obtained possession of it. Owing to its natural position its strategic value has always been very great, and it was strongly fortified in 1910.

The cathedral chapter prior to the Concordat of 1851 consisted of 6 dignities, 24 canons, 22 benefices, but after the concordat the number was reduced to 16 canons and 12 beneficed clerics.

In 1910 the Catholic population of the diocese was 185,000 souls scattered over 395 parishes and ministered to by 598 priests. Besides 395 churches for public worship, there were in the diocese five religious communities of men, six of women, and several hospitals in charge of nuns. The seminary accommodated 500 students.

1995–1998 Segregation of the Western Parishes
In 1995, following the Ilerdensis et Barbastrensis de finum mutatione decree, 84 culturally Catalan La Franja parishes that had traditionally belonged to the  Roman Catholic Diocese of Lleida  for over eight centuries, were segregated and transferred to the Roman Catholic Diocese of Barbastro-Monzón. These were followed by a further 27 parishes in June 1998. The amputated parishes were in the Llitera and Baix Cinca Catalan-speaking Aragonese areas.

After the parish segregation a controversy began regarding the return of ancient works of art belonging to the segregated parishes and which were stored at the Lleida Diocesan Museum. The decree and the ensuing controversies were perceived as anti-Catalan measures by many in Lleida and in the concerned parishes, as they were not previously consulted, and part of a strategy to assimilate the La Franja people into the Spanish-speaking mainstream congregation by cutting them off from their cultural roots.

Bishops of Lleida (6th to 9th centuries)
All the names (except the first one) are given in Catalan:
 Itxió 203
 Sant Filó 227
 Joan 230
 Pere 258
 Màrius Seli 259
 c. 269 : St. Lleïr  — (Mentioned in 269)
 c. 516 : Oronci — (Mentioned between 516 and 517)
 c. 519 : Pere
 c. 540 : Andreu — (Mentioned in 540)
 c. 546 : Februari — (Mentioned in 546)
 c. 589 : Polibi — (Mentioned in 589)
 c. 592 : Julià — (Mentioned in 592)
 c. 599 : Ameli — (Mentioned in 599)
 c. 614 : Gomarel — (Mentioned in 614)
 c. 635 : Fructuós — (Mentioned between 633 and 638)
 c. 653 : Gandelè — (Mentioned in 653)
 c. 690 : Eusend — (Mentioned between 683 and 693)
 c. 715 : Esteve  — (before 714 – after 719)
 c. 780 : San Medard  — (after 778)
 c. 842 : Jacob

After the Moorish conquest the Diocese of Lleida is transferred to Roda.

Bishops of Roda (until 1101)

After the Moorish conquest the Diocese of Lleida is transferred to Roda.
All the names are given in Catalan:

 887–922 : Adulf — (since before 887 to 922)
 923–955 : Ató
 955–975 : Odisend
 988–991 : Aimeric — (since before 988 to 991)
 996---?--- : Jacob — (since before 996)
 1006–1015 : Aimeric II — (since before 1006 to 1015)
 1017–1019 : Borrell
 1023–1067 : Arnulf
 1068–1075 : Salomó
 1075–1076 : Arnulf II
 1076–1094 : Pere Ramon Dalmaci
 1094–1096 : Llop
 1097–1100 : Ponç

In 1101 the Diocese of Roda is transferred to Barbastro.

Bishops of Barbastro-Roda (1101–1149)
In 1101 the Diocese of Roda is transferred to Barbastro.
All the names are given in Catalan:

 1101–1104 : Ponç
 1104–1126 : St. Ramon — (named Ramon II in the Catholic Encyclopedia)
 ---------1126 : Esteve
 1126–1134: Pere Guillem
 1134 : Ramir, a prince of the royal house of Aragon — (Elected)
 1135–1143 : Gaufrid
 1143–1149 : Guillermo Pérez de Ravitats

In 1149 the episcopal see returned to Lleida.

Bishops of Lleida (since 1149)
In 1149 the episcopal see returned to Lleida.

 1149–1176 : Guillem Pérez de Ravitats
 1177–1190 : Guillem Berenguer
 1191–1205 : Gombald de Camporells
 1205–1235 : Berenguer d'Erill
 1236–1238 : Pere d'Albalat
 1238–1247 : Ramon de Siscar
 1248–1255 : Guillem de Barberà
 --------–1256 : Berenguer de Peralta
 1257–1278 : Guillem de Moncada
 1282–c. 1286 Guillem Bernáldez de Fluvià — (1282 – before 1286)
 1290–1298 : Gerard d'Andria
 1299–1308 : Pere de Rei
 1308–1313 : Ponç d'Aguilaniu
 1314–1321 : Guillem d'Aranyó — (before 1314 – 1321)
 1322–1324 : Ponç de Villamur
 1324–1327 : Ramon d'Avignó
 1327–1334 : Arnald de Cescomes
 1334–1340 : Ferrer de Colom
 1341–1348 : Jaume Sitjó
 1348–1360 : Esteve Mulceo
 1361–1380 : Romeu de Cescomes
 1380–1386 : Ramón
 1387–1399 : Gerau de Requesens
 --------–1399 : Pere de Santcliment
 --------–1403 : Joan de Baufés
 1403–1407 : Pere de Sagarriga i de Pau
 1407–1411 : Pere de Cardona
 1415–1434 : Domènec Ram i Lanaja
 1435–1449 : García Aznárez de Añon
 1449–1459 : Antoni Cerdà
 1459–1510 : Lluís Joan de Milà
 1510–1512 : Joan d'Enguera
 1512–1542 : Jaime de Conchillos
 --------–1542 : Martí Valero
 1543–1553 : Ferran de Loaces i Pérez
 1553–1554 : Joan Arias
 1556–1559 : Miquel Despuig i Vacarte
 1561–1576 : Antonio Agustín y Albanell
 1577–1578 : Miguel Thomàs de Taxaquet
 1580–1581 : Carles Domènech
 1583–1585 : Benet de Tocco
 1585–1586 : Gaspar Joan de la Figuera
 1586–1591 : Joan Martínez de Villatoriel — (Inquisitor General).
 1592–1597 : Pere d'Aragó
 1599–1620 : Francesco Virgili
 1621–1632 : Pere Anton Serra
 --------–1633 : Antonio Pérez (archbishop)
 --------–1634 : Pere de Magarola i Fontanet
 1635–1642 : Bernat Caballero de Paredes
 1644–1650 : Pere de Santiago
 1656–1664 : Miquel de Escartín
 1664–1667 : Brauli Sunyer
 1668–1673 : Josep Minot
 1673–1680 : Jaume de Copons
 1680–1681 : Francesc Berardo
 1682–1698 : Miguel Jerónimo de Molina
 1699–1700 : Joan de Santamaríi Alonso i Valeria
 1701–1714 : Francesc de Solís
 1714–1735 : Francesc de Olasso Hipenza
 1736–1756 : Gregori Galindo
 1757–1770 : Manuel Macías Pedrejón
 1771–1783 : Joaquim Antoni Sánchez Ferragudo
 1783–1816 : Jeroni Maria de Torres
 1816–1817 : Manuel del Villar
 --------–1818 : Remigi Lasanta Ortega
 1819–1824 : Simó Antoni de Rentería i Reyes
 1824–1832 : Pau Colmenares
 1833–1844 : Julià Alonso
 1848–1850 : Josep Domènec Costa i Borràs
 1850–1861 : Pere Ciril Uriz i Labayru
 1862–1870 : Marià Puigllat i Amigó
 1875–1889 : Tomàs Costa i Fornaguera
 1889–1905 : Josep Meseguer i Costa
 1905–1914 : Juan Antonio Ruano y Martín
 1914–1925 : Josep Miralles Sbert
 1926–1930 : Manuel Irurita Almandoz
 1935–1936 : Salvio Huix Miralpeix
 1938–1943 : Manuel Moll i Salord
 1944–1947 : Joan Villar Sanz
 1947–1967 : Aurelio del Pino Gómez
 1968–1999 : Ramon Malla Call
 1999–2007 : Francesc-Xavier Ciuraneta Aymí
 2008–2015 : Juan Piris Frígola
 2015–present : Salvador Giménez Valls

See also
La Franja
 Bishop of Lleida

References

  Catholic Encyclopedia, 1910 and 1907: Lleida and Barbastro
  IBERCRONOX: Obispado de Lérida (Ilerda) and Obispado de Barbastro-Monzón

External links
 Diocese of Lleida 

Lleida
Religion in Lleida
Roman Catholic dioceses in Catalonia
Roman Catholic dioceses in Spain
Dioceses established in the 3rd century